Grant's gazelle (Nanger granti) is a relatively large species of gazelle antelope, distributed from northern Tanzania to South Sudan and Ethiopia, and from the Kenyan coast to Lake Victoria. Its Swahili name is swala granti. It was named for a 19th-century British explorer, James Grant.

Taxonomy and genetics
Grant's gazelle is genetically related to Soemmerring's gazelle (N. soemmerringii) and Thomson's gazelle  (Eudorcas thomsonii) with Soemmering's gazelle being the closer relative. Grant's gazelle shows high genetic variation among its populations, although there is no geographic isolation. The differentiation of the species may have evolved during repeated expansion and contraction of arid habitats during the late Pleistocene era in which populations were possibly isolated. Grant's gazelle was formerly considered a member of the genus Gazella within the subgenus Nanger before Nanger was elevated to genus status. In 2021, the American Society of Mammalogists granted full species status to Bright's gazelle (Nanger notatus) and the Peter's gazelle (Nanger petersii).

Subspecies
Listed alphabetically.
 N. g. granti (Brooke, 1872) – southern Grant's gazelle
 N. g. lacuum (Neumann, 1906) – northern Grant's gazelle
 N. g. robertsi (Thomas, 1903) – Robert's gazelle

Description

The Grant's gazelle stands  at the shoulder. Its coat is a beige orange on the back with a white belly. A useful field mark is the white on the rump that extends over the top of the tail in Grant's but not Thomson's gazelles. The subspecies are segregated by different morphological characters, such as horn shape and slight differences in coat colour. These differences are not indicative of ecological separation as with some species.

Ecology and behaviour

The Grant's gazelle is found in East Africa and lives in open grass plains and is frequently found in shrublands; it avoids areas with high grass where the visibility of predators is compromised. They also occur in semiarid areas and are relatively well adapted to dry areas, relying on more browse or leafy material during dry seasons to supplement their intake of water. They are sometimes migratory, but do not travel along with most of the other ungulates, such as Thomson's gazelles, zebras, and wildebeest, which are more water dependent. They can subsist on vegetation in waterless, semiarid areas, where they face less competition.

The most common predators of the Grant's gazelle are cheetahs and wild dogs. Humans also hunt gazelles. In the Serengeti, Grant's gazelle is a prey item for cheetahs, but the Thomson's gazelle is  preferred. However, in Nairobi National Park, Grant's gazelle is preferred over Thomson's gazelle, making it an important resource to the cheetah. Jackals are major predators of fawns.

The Grant's gazelle is a gregarious, territorial, and sometimes migratory species. The home ranges of females overlap with those of the males. Only male gazelles are territorial. Male gazelles will herd all females that cross their territories. When the females are in estrus, they are strongly guarded by the dominant male, which prevents other males from mating with them. Any female that tries to leave is aggressively herded back. Most of the time, the male's stance in relation to her is enough to keep the female from leaving.

Bachelor groups are made up of adolescent and adults not holding territory. Any new members perform intimidation displays to enter the group. However, bachelor groups tend to be loose and members can leave whenever they want. Grant's gazelles will sometimes join groups of Thomson's gazelles to protect themselves from predators. Predators are less likely to attack the Grant's gazelle when associated with these mixed groups, perhaps because the Thomson's gazelle provides an easier target. The larger, older males with thick horns have the best chance of establishing a territory. Conflicts between adult males are usually solved with intimidation displays. The bucks circle each other and swing their necks from side to side, displaying their neck power. Neck strength is important in an actual fight and the male that cannot keep up yields. Gazelles of nearly equal neck strength are more likely to engage in actual combat. Fighting occurs in young males more often than older ones. Dominant males can simply run off subordinates rather than having to display to them.

Diet
Grant's gazelles are generally mixed feeders that both browse and graze. In one study, their diet consisted of 66% browse and 34% graze. Rainfall seems to be a determinant of their diets. One way the Grant's gazelle withstands dehydration and heat stress is by being very efficient in digesting dry matter. Grant's gazelles consume a smaller amount of food than domesticated animals, but they are better-suited for extreme environments because they derive protein from forage more quickly. The Grant's gazelle's diet may be responsible for the slow growth rates of browsed plants. They get most of their moisture from the plants they eat, so they do not often have to drink water. Thus they can stay on the plains long after the rains end. In dry seasons, gazelles move deep into dense brush and wait for the next rains. They will eat red oat grass and small, tough plants, which are avoided by the other ungulates. This allows the gazelles to survive in the brush during the dry season. Grant's gazelles eat mainly dicotyledons during the dry season and grass in the wet season.

Reproduction
Grant's gazelles sexually mature at 18 months. Territory-holding males mate more than those in bachelor groups. The courting ritual begins with a male following a female, waiting for her to urinate. When she does, the male does the Flehmen response to determine if she is in estrus. If she is, he will continue to follow her. The female will lift her tail, signaling she is ready to mate, and the male will mount her. The gestation period for the gazelle lasts for 198 days. Births in the Serengeti peak in January and February. A female will leave her herd and find a well-hidden place to give birth. Afterwards, the female eats the afterbirth and other fluids to keep the fawn clean and scentless. Females that have recently given birth will stay together for protection. The females nurse their fawns four times a day. Fawns are immobile for the first few days, and the mother stays close by. When the fawn can walk, it leaves with its mother to join a herd. Around this time, fawns will associate with one another in peer groups. A gazelle is weaned at six months, but will continue to associate with its mother until adolescence.

Threats and conservation
The Grant's gazelle is still a common species, despite having been eradicated in certain areas. Major threats have been habitat destruction and poaching. The gazelle's status as an unthreatened species is dependent on protection of the national parks and reserves where it lives, including Serengeti National Park and Ngorongoro Conservation Area in Tanzania, and Lake Turkana National Parks in Kenya. Estimates of the population range from 140,000 to 350,000. While certain areas have stable populations, overall the population trend is going downward.

References

Grant's gazelle
Mammals of Tanzania
Mammals of South Sudan
Mammals of Somalia
Mammals of Ethiopia
Mammals of Kenya
Mammals of Uganda
Fauna of East Africa
Grant's gazelle